As of 2021, Switzerland have appeared at five UEFA European Championships, between 1996 and 2020 (held in 2021 due to the COVID-19 pandemic). They have advanced past the first round twice, reaching the last 16 in 2016 and the quarter-finals in 2020 for the first time, before being eliminated by Spain on penalties following a 1–1 draw in extra time.

Overall record

*Denotes draws including knockout matches decided via penalty shoot-out.
**Red border colour indicates that the tournament was held on home soil.

Euro 1996

Group stage

Euro 2004

Group stage

Euro 2008

Group stage

Euro 2016

Group stage

Knockout phase

Round of 16

Euro 2020

Group stage

Ranking of third-placed teams

Knockout phase

Round of 16

Quarter-finals

Goalscorers

References

 
Countries at the UEFA European Championship